The 2010 Russian Artistic Gymnastics Championships was held in Penza, Russia, at the Burtases Gymnastics Centre between 1–14 March 2010.

Medalists

Men's results

Senior Team Final

Senior Floor Exercise Final

Senior Pommel Horse Final

Senior Still Rings Final

Senior Vault Final

Senior Parallel Bars Final

Senior Horizontal Bars Final

Women's Results

Senior Team Final

Senior All-Around Final

Senior Vault Final

Senior Uneven Bars Final

Senior Balance Beam Final

Senior Floor Exercise Final

References

External links
  Official site

2010 in gymnastics
Artistic Gymnastics Championships
Russian Artistic Gymnastics Championships
March 2010 sports events in Russia